Trioncube, fully titled  in Japan, is a puzzle video game developed by Bandai Namco Games and released for the Nintendo DS.

Gameplay
The game is a 'falling block' title, a la Tetris, and features many similar blocks. The objective of the game is to form 3×3 squares to clear blocks and reach a set objective (unless playing in endless mode). Once a 3×3 square has been formed, more pieces can be attached to form more 3×3 squares and clear other blocks on the screen. These chains will remain on screen until a piece is placed which does not add to it.

The single-player section features an arcade mode, a story mode which adds concepts such as useless blocks, and an endless mode. The game also contains two player multiplayer via WiFi, which supports both single-cart and multi-cart play.

Development
Trioncube was developed by Bandai Namco Games. The game was chiefly designed by Kouji Asuna and was produced by Hideo Yoshizawa, known for his work on the Mr. Driller series of puzzle games. The idea for the game came to Asuna while he was at home, watching television after a bath. He had been working on a separate puzzle game at the time and was stuck on how to bring the project together. "Something just clicked in my head as soon as this certain shape appeared on the screen," he explained. "That was the moment Trioncube started to [materialize] in my head." Asuna wanted to make Trioncube unique by emphasizing large combos rather than clearing lines. Asuna considered utilizing the DS touchscreen for moving blocks, but chose not to because "it didn’t really feel natural or make things easier". The game's "cute" aesthetic was also intentional, evolving from a more basic interface to one the design team hoped would appeal to both younger and female players.

Reception

The game is said to be far too easy, with the slow pace of the game giving a lack of challenge and making it dull. ONM mentioned that the game was not as addictive as Tetris, and there were better puzzle games on the DS.

References

2006 video games
Bandai Namco games
Nintendo DS games
Nintendo DS-only games
Puzzle video games
Multiplayer and single-player video games
Video games developed in Japan